Carlo Urbina or Urbini (16th century) was an Italian painter, active in Crema. He painted for the town-hall, and for churches of Milan, including the ceilings of one of the transepts of Santa Maria della Passione. The Brera has a Baptism of Christ by him.

References

People from Crema, Lombardy
16th-century Italian painters
Italian male painters
Italian Renaissance painters
Painters from Lombardy
Year of death unknown
Year of birth unknown